Bekzhan Talantbekovich Sagynbayev (born September 11, 1994) is a Kyrgyzstani professional footballer who currently plays as a left winger or a left back for Hong Kong Premier League club Kitchee.

Club career
He won the Kyrgyzstan League in 2018 with Dordoi Bishkek.

International career
Sagynbayev made his debut for the Kyrgyzstan national football team in a 2019 AFC Asian Cup qualification match on March 22, 2018 against Myanmar. Kyrgyzstan won the match 5–1 and Sagynbayev scored the last goal. He was included in Kyrgyzstan's squad for the 2019 AFC Asian Cup in the United Arab Emirates.

Career statistics

International
Statistics accurate as of match played 21 January 2019

International goals
Scores and results list Kyrgyzstan's goal tally first.

References

External links
Player Profile at Dordoi Bishkek

1994 births
Living people
Sportspeople from Bishkek
Kyrgyzstan international footballers
Kyrgyzstani footballers
FC Dordoi Bishkek players
Association football forwards
2019 AFC Asian Cup players